Zombie Night is a 2003 Canadian horror film directed by David J. Francis, written by Francis and his wife Amber Lynn Francis, and starring Danny Ticknovich and Sandra Segovic.

Plot 
After World War 3, the dead have risen and are eating the living after the sun goes down. A group of survivors are holed up in a building fighting off the undead. One night though, the zombies break through and the group is forced to evacuate. They find themselves running through the woods, trying at all costs to stay alive.

Cast 
 Danny Ticknovich as Dave
 Sandra Segovic as Shelley
 Dwayne Moniz as Derek
 Alexiannia Pearson as Becca
 Steve Curtis as Keith
 Andrea Ramolo as Amber
 Amber Lynn Francis as Lesley
 David J. Francis as Man Peeing
Claude LImùberger as zombie 11

Reception 
Mike Watt of Film Threat rated the film 3.5 out of 5 and wrote, "It was made with such earnest affection to the genre that it's difficult to be negative towards it."  Bloody Disgusting rated it 2/5 stars and criticized the acting and dialogue.  Peter Dendle wrote, "Unconvincing actors try to make you think the world is coming to an end by running around abandoned buildings in this anemic offering from Hamilton, Ontario."

Sequels 
A sequel was produced, Zombie Night 2: Awakening. There was also a mock documentary, following the film makers as they attempt to make Reel Zombies in a time of real zombies.

References

External links 
 
 

2003 films
2003 horror films
2000s comedy horror films
English-language Canadian films
2000s English-language films
Zombie comedy films
Films shot in Hamilton, Ontario
Canadian comedy horror films
Canadian zombie films
2003 comedy films
2000s Canadian films